Wallace Frankham "Frank" Snodgrass (24 April 1898 – 16 July 1976) was a New Zealand rugby union player. A wing, Snodgrass represented Hawke's Bay and Nelson at a provincial level, and was a member of the New Zealand national side, the All Blacks, in 1923 and 1928. He played three matches for the All Blacks but did not play any internationals.

Snodgrass was educated at Nelson College from 1912 to 1913. His father was William Snodgrass, who served as Mayor of Nelson from 1917 to 1921 and was a member of the Legislative Council.

References

1898 births
1976 deaths
People educated at Nelson College
New Zealand rugby union players
New Zealand international rugby union players
Rugby union players from Nelson, New Zealand
Nelson rugby union players
Hawke's Bay rugby union players
Rugby union wings